María Fernanda Navia Cardona (born 1 January 1979 in Bogotá)  is a Colombian journalist, model, and former beauty queen. She was Miss Bogotá 2000 and participated as the city's delegate at Miss Colombia 2000 and Former Miss Earth Colombia.

Navia majored in Social Communication and Journalism from the University of La Sabana.  She has worked on local channel Citytv, Canal Uno's gossip programme Sweet and CM& newscast, Cable Noticias, TV Azteca's tabloid newsmagazine Asignación especial, as a correspondent for Telemundo, and W Radio.

Since June 2011 she works as presenter of a segment on Noticias Uno newscast.

References

External links 
MySpace page
Twitter page
Noticias Uno

1979 births
Colombian female models
Colombian radio presenters
Colombian women radio presenters
Colombian television journalists
Colombian television presenters
Living people
Miss Colombia
Colombian women journalists
Women television journalists
Colombian women television presenters
University of La Sabana alumni